Gremyachye is a rural locality (a khutor) and the administrative center of Gremyachenskoye Rural Settlement, Khokholsky District, Voronezh Oblast, Russia. The population was   3,373 as of 2010. There are 39 streets.

Geography 
Gremyachye is located 29 km southeast of Khokholsky (the district's administrative centre) by road. Novogremyachenskoye is the nearest rural locality.

References 

Rural localities in Khokholsky District